Michael Connor may refer to:

Michael L. Connor, American politician and government official
Michael J. Connor, US Navy admiral
Michael Connor (voice actor) in Spyro the Dragon
Michael Connor (screenwriter) of Sword of Freedom
Mike Connor (author), see List of Ace titles in numeric series
Mike Connor (rugby league), player for South Wales Scorpions

See also
Michael Connors (disambiguation)